Janet Anne Royall, Baroness Royall of Blaisdon,  (born 20 August 1955), is a British Labour Co-operative Party politician. She was Leader of the House of Lords and Lord President of the Council. She is the principal of Somerville College, Oxford.

Education and early political career
Royall grew up in Gloucestershire in Hucclecote and Newnham on Severn, where her parents ran a shop.

Royall was educated at the Royal Forest of Dean Grammar School and Westfield College, University of London, where she gained a BA in Spanish and French in 1977.

Royall was a special adviser to Neil Kinnock, the leader of the Labour Party, in the 1980s, and she has remained a close ally of his ever since. She sought selection as Labour's candidate for Ogmore in a 2002 by-election, losing to Huw Irranca-Davies. In 2003 she became head of the European Commission office in Wales.

House of Lords
On 25 June 2004, she was created a life peer as Baroness Royall of Blaisdon, of Blaisdon in the County of Gloucestershire. She spoke for the Health, International Development and Foreign and Commonwealth Affairs.

On 24 January 2008 Royall was appointed government chief whip in the House of Lords, on the resignation of Lord Grocott. She was appointed a Privy Counsellor later in the year. On 3 October 2008, she was appointed to the cabinet by Gordon Brown, as Leader of the House of Lords and Lord President of the Council. On 5 June 2009, Royall was succeeded as Lord President by Lord Mandelson, the Business Secretary, and was appointed Chancellor of the Duchy of Lancaster.

She voted for a 100% elected House, on the last occasion that the House of Lords voted on Reform of the House of Lords in March 2007. She has called for a national referendum on any reforms of the chamber.

In September 2012, she spoke out against the proposed badger cull.

She announced in May 2015 that she would not seek re-election as the Leader of the Opposition in the House of Lords.

In 2016, she chaired an investigation into allegations of antisemitism in Oxford University Labour Club and was subsequently one of two Vice-Chairs of the Chakrabarti Inquiry into antisemitism in the UK Labour Party.

Principal of Somerville College

In February 2017, Somerville College, Oxford, announced the selection of Baroness Royall as its next principal. She succeeded Alice Prochaska at the end of August 2017.

Personal life
She was married to Stuart Hercock from 1980 until his death in 2010, and has a daughter, Charlie, and two sons, Ned and Harry.

References

External links
 Profile at www.parliament.uk
Baroness Royall of Blaisdon from Dod Online
The Rt Hon the Baroness Royall of Blaisdon, PC at Debrett's People of Today

|-

|-

|-

|-

|-

|-

1955 births
Alumni of Westfield College
Alumni of the University of London
Chancellors of the Duchy of Lancaster
Female members of the Cabinet of the United Kingdom
Honourable Corps of Gentlemen at Arms
Labour Co-operative life peers
Leaders of the House of Lords
Living people
Life peeresses created by Elizabeth II
Members of the Fabian Society
Members of the Privy Council of the United Kingdom
People from Newnham on Severn
People from the Borough of Tewkesbury
Principals of Somerville College, Oxford